Gustave Fonjallaz (born 1910, date of death unknown) was a Swiss bobsledder who competed in the late 1920s and early 1930s. He won the silver medal in the four-man event at the 1931 FIBT World Championships in St. Moritz.

References
Bobsleigh four-man world championship medalists since 1930

Swiss male bobsledders
1910 births
Year of death missing
20th-century Swiss people